Purdey's is a soft drink produced by Orchid Drinks Ltd. which is owned by Britvic. It is sold in the United Kingdom, the Republic of Ireland, Australia, the Netherlands and Belgium. It is sold in 330ml brown glass bottles with a silver or black plastic label that covers the whole bottle. 

There are three variants:
Purdey's Rejuvenate (formerly known as Active Life) - This has a blend of grape and apple juices, no added sugar, and is sold in a silver wrapped brown bottle and is suitable for vegans.

Purdey's Refocus -Carbonated Water, Fruit Juices from Concentrate 35% (Grape 25%, Apple 8%, Blackberry 1%, Sloe 1%), Botanical Extracts, no added sugar, and is sold in a silver wrapped brown bottle and is suitable for Vegans.

Purdey's Replenish - Carbonated Water, Fruit Juices from Concentrate 25% (Apple 23%, Raspberry 2%)...Botanical Extracts, no added sugar, and is sold in a silver wrapped brown bottle and suitable for vegans.

Some of these are also available in cans depending on country and stock availability.

Discontinued:
Purdey's Edge - This had a blend of dark fruit juices, no added sugar, and was sold in a dark bottle.

Purdey's Activation (formerly known as Active Body) - This was marketed as a healthy energy drink, contained a combination of sugars, and was sold in a gold bottle.

All variants are made of fruit juices and sparkling spring water and botanical extracts, and fortified with vitamins.

In some countries, nutritional content labels are required on each product's label.

References

Soft drinks